Chaetodon is a tropical fish genus in the family Chaetodontidae. Like their relatives, they are known as "butterflyfish". This genus is by far the largest among the Chaetodontidae, with about 90 living species included here, though most might warrant recognition as distinct genera.

Species
There are currently 87 recognized species in this genus:

Chaetodon sensu stricto
 Chaetodon capistratus Linnaeus, 1758 (Foureye butterflyfish)
 Chaetodon ocellatus Bloch, 1787 (Spotfin butterflyfish)
 Chaetodon striatus Linnaeus, 1758 (Banded butterflyfish)

C. robustus group
 Chaetodon hoefleri Steindachner, 1881 (Four-banded butterflyfish)
 Chaetodon robustus Günther, 1860 (Three-banded butterflyfish)

Lepidochaetodon group

Subgenus Exornator (including Burgessius, Heterochaetodon and possibly Rhombochaetodon; tentatively placed here)
 Chaetodon citrinellus G. Cuvier, 1831 (Speckled butterflyfish, Citron butterflyfish)
 Chaetodon dolosus C. G. E. Ahl, 1923 (African butterflyfish)
 Chaetodon guentheri C. G. E. Ahl, 1923 (Crochet butterflyfish)
 Chaetodon guttatissimus E. T. Bennett, 1833 (Peppered butterflyfish)
 Chaetodon miliaris Quoy & Gaimard, 1825 (Millet butterflyfish)
 Chaetodon multicinctus A. Garrett, 1863 (Pebbled butterflyfish)
 Chaetodon pelewensis Kner, 1868 (Sunset butterflyfish)
 Chaetodon punctatofasciatus G. Cuvier, 1831 (Spotband butterflyfish)
 Chaetodon quadrimaculatus J. E. Gray, 1831 (Fourspot butterflyfish)
 Chaetodon sedentarius Poey, 1860 (Reef butterflyfish)

Subgenus Lepidochaetodon (including Tifia)
 Chaetodon daedalma D. S. Jordan & Fowler, 1902 (Wrought-iron butterflyfish) (tentatively placed here)
 Chaetodon interruptus C. G. E. Ahl, 1923 (Yellow teardrop butterflyfish)
 Chaetodon kleinii Bloch, 1790 (Sunburst butterflyfish, black-lipped butterflyfish, Klein's butterflyfish)
 Chaetodon litus J. E. Randall & D. K. Caldwell, 1973 (Easter Island butterflyfish) (tentatively placed here)
 Chaetodon nippon Steindachner & Döderlein (de), 1883 (Japanese butterflyfish) (tentatively placed here)
 Chaetodon smithi J. E. Randall, 1975 (Smith's butterflyfish) (tentatively placed here)
 Chaetodon trichrous Günther, 1874 (Tahiti butterflyfish)
 Chaetodon unimaculatus Bloch, 1787 (Teardrop butterflyfish)

Subgenus Rhombochaetodon (including Roaops, might belong in Exornator; tentatively placed here)
 Chaetodon argentatus H. M. Smith & Radcliffe, 1911 (Asian butterflyfish)
 Chaetodon blackburnii Desjardins, 1836 (Brownburnie) (tentatively placed here)
 Chaetodon burgessi G. R. Allen & Starck, 1973 (Burgess' butterflyfish)
 Chaetodon declivis J. E. Randall, 1975 (Marquesas butterflyfish) (tentatively placed here)
 Chaetodon flavocoronatus R. F. Myers, 1980 (Yellow-crowned butterflyfish) (tentatively placed here)
 Chaetodon fremblii E. T. Bennett, 1828 (Blue-striped butterflyfish)
 Chaetodon madagaskariensis C. G. E. Ahl, 1923 (Seychelles butterflyfish)
 Chaetodon mertensii G. Cuvier, 1831 (Atoll butterflyfish)
 Chaetodon mitratus Günther, 1860 (Indian butterflyfish) (tentatively placed here)
 Chaetodon paucifasciatus C. G. E. Ahl, 1923 (Eritrean butterflyfish, Crown butterflyfish)
 Chaetodon tinkeri L. P. Schultz, 1951 (Hawaiian butterflyfish) (tentatively placed here)
 Chaetodon xanthurus Bleeker, 1857 (Pearlscale butterflyfish, Philippines chevron butterflyfish, yellow-tailed butterflyfish)

Megaprotodon group

Subgenus "Citharoedus" (tentatively placed here)
 Chaetodon meyeri Bloch & J. G. Schneider, 1801 (Scrawled butterflyfish)
 Chaetodon ornatissimus G. Cuvier, 1831 (Ornate butterflyfish)
 Chaetodon reticulatus G. Cuvier, 1831 (Mailed butterflyfish)

Subgenus Corallochaetodon (tentatively placed here)
 Chaetodon austriacus Rüppell, 1836 (Blacktail butterflyfish, exquisite butterflyfish)
 Chaetodon lunulatus Quoy & Gaimard, 1825 (Oval butterflyfish, red-finned butterflyfish)
 Chaetodon melapterus Guichenot, 1863 (Arabian butterflyfish) (tentatively placed here)
 Chaetodon trifasciatus M. Park, 1797 (Melon butterflyfish)

Subgenus Discochaetodon
 Chaetodon aureofasciatus W. J. Macleay, 1878 (Golden butterflyfish)
 Chaetodon octofasciatus Bloch, 1787 (Eightband butterflyfish)
 Chaetodon rainfordi McCulloch, 1923 (Rainford's butterflyfish)
 Chaetodon tricinctus Waite, 1901 (Three-striped butterflyfish) (tentatively placed here)

Subgenus Gonochaetodon (tentatively placed here)
 Chaetodon baronessa G. Cuvier, 1829 (Eastern triangular butterflyfish)
 Chaetodon larvatus G. Cuvier, 1831 (Hooded butterflyfish)
 Chaetodon triangulum G. Cuvier, 1831 (Triangle butterflyfish)

Subgenus Megaprotodon
 Chaetodon trifascialis Quoy & Gaimard, 1825 (Chevron Butterflyfish, Triangulate butterflyfish, V-lined butterflyfish)

Subgenus Tetrachaetodon
 Chaetodon andamanensis Kuiter & Debelius (de), 1999 (Andaman butterflyfish) (tentatively placed here)
 Chaetodon bennetti G. Cuvier, 1831 (Bluelashed butterflyfish)
 Chaetodon plebeius G. Cuvier, 1831 (Blue-blotched butterflyfish)
 Chaetodon speculum G. Cuvier, 1831 (Mirror butterflyfish)
 Chaetodon zanzibarensis Playfair (fr), 1867 (Zanzibar butterflyfish)

Rabdophorus group
Including Aspilurochaetodon, Chaetodontops

 Chaetodon adiergastos Seale, 1910 (Philippine butterflyfish)
 Chaetodon auriga Forsskål, 1775 (Threadfin butterflyfish)
 Chaetodon auripes D. S. Jordan & Snyder, 1901 (Oriental butterflyfish) (tentatively placed here)
 Chaetodon collare Bloch, 1787 (Redtail butterflyfish, Pakistani butterflyfish)
 Chaetodon decussatus  G. Cuvier, 1829 (Indian vagabond butterflyfish)
 Chaetodon ephippium  G. Cuvier, 1831 (Saddle butterflyfish)
 Chaetodon falcula Bloch, 1795 (Blackwedged butterflyfish)
 Chaetodon fasciatus Forsskål, 1775 (Diagonal butterflyfish, Red Sea raccoon butterflyfish)
 Chaetodon flavirostris Günther, 1874 (Black butterflyfish)
 Chaetodon gardineri Norman, 1939 (Gardner's butterflyfish) (tentatively placed here)
 Chaetodon leucopleura Playfair, 1867 (Somali butterflyfish) (tentatively placed here)
 Chaetodon lineolatus  G. Cuvier, 1831 (Lined butterflyfish)
 Chaetodon lunula (Lacépède, 1802) (Raccoon butterflyfish, Crescent-masked butterflyfish, lunule butterflyfish)
 Chaetodon melannotus Bloch & J. G. Schneider, 1801 (Blackback butterflyfish)
 Chaetodon mesoleucos Forsskål, 1775 (White-faced butterflyfish)
 Chaetodon nigropunctatus Sauvage, 1880 (Black-spotted butterflyfish) (tentatively placed here)
 Chaetodon ocellicaudus  G. Cuvier, 1831 (Spot-tail butterflyfish)
 Chaetodon oxycephalus Bleeker, 1853 (Spot-naped butterflyfish)
 Chaetodon pictus Forsskål, 1775 (Horseshoe butterflyfish)
 Chaetodon rafflesii Anonymous [Bennett], 1830  (Latticed butterflyfish)
 Chaetodon selene Bleeker, 1853 (Yellow-dotted butterflyfish)
 Chaetodon semeion Bleeker, 1855 (Dotted butterflyfish)
 Chaetodon semilarvatus G. Cuvier, 1831 (Bluecheek butterflyfish)
 Chaetodon ulietensis  G. Cuvier, 1831 (Pacific double-saddle butterflyfish, false falcula butterflyfish)
 Chaetodon vagabundus Linnaeus, 1758 (Vagabond butterflyfish)
 Chaetodon wiebeli Kaup, 1863 (Hong Kong butterflyfish)
 Chaetodon xanthocephalus E. T. Bennett, 1833 (Yellowhead butterflyfish) (tentatively placed here)

Incertae sedis
Most are probably either Chaetodon sensu stricto or C. robustus group.
 Chaetodon assarius Waite, 1905 (West Australian butterflyfish)
 Chaetodon dialeucos Salm & Mee, 1989 (Oman butterflyfish)
 Chaetodon humeralis Günther, 1860
 Chaetodon marleyi Regan, 1921 (Doublesash butterflyfish)
 Chaetodon sanctaehelenae Günther, 1868 (Saint Helena butterflyfish)

Proposed subgenera
Several subgenera have been proposed for splitting out of this group. It is becoming clear how the genus might be split up, with a range  of DNA sequence data in large parts agreeing with S.D. Blum's landmark 1988 phylogenetic assessment of osteology.

Basically, a core group around the type species Chaetodon capistratus would remain in Chaetodon, while maybe four clades would be split off. These could use the names Lepidochaetodon, Megaprotodon and Rabdophorus, and there is one unnamed group containing the Three-banded Butterflyfish (C. robustus) and its relatives. But the monophyly of the Lepidochaetodon group is not fully established; it is both unclear whether Rhombochaetodon is a lineage distinct from Exornator, and whether Lepidochaetodon is indeed closer to these than to any other Chaetodon, particularly to some lineages otherwise placed in Megaprotodon.

Prognathodes, for some time contained in Chaetodon, is worthy of recognition as full genus, as is Roa.

Historically, more distantly related fish were placed in Chaetodon too, for resembling them in details – e.g. the common scat Scatophagus argus, which has a similar shape and size, as well as armored larvae like the Chaetodontidae – or simply because they are colorful, smallish, and unusually-looking – e.g. the quite unrelated paradise fish, as C. chinensis.

The classification proposed in Fessler and Westneat is based on the species of Chaetodon they sampled and these sorted into the following clades:

Clade 1
Chaetodon robustus
Chaetodon hoefleri
Clade 2 
Chaetodon kleini
Chaetodon unimaculatus
Chaetodon fremblii
Chaetodon burgessi 
Chaetodon xanthurus
Chaetodon paucifasciatus
Chaetodon mertensi 
Chaetodon quadrimaculatus
Chaetodon citrinellus
Chaetodon multicinctus
Chaetodon punctatofasciatus
Chaetodon pelewensis
Chaetodon sedentarius
Chaetodon dolosus
Chaetodon miliaris
Chaetodon guentheri
Clade 3
Chaetodon austriacus
Chaetodon trifasciatus
Chaetodon ornatissimus
Chaetodon reticularis 
Chaetodon meyeri 
Chaetodon larvatus
Chaetodon baronessa 
Chaetodon trifascialis
Chaetodon rainfordi 
Chaetodon octofasciatus
Chaetodon bennetti 
Chaetodon plebius
Chaetodon speculum
Chaetodon zanzibarensis
Clade 4
Chaetodon ocellatus
Chaetodon capistratus
Chaetodon striatus 
Chaetodon semeion 
Chaetodon ephippium
Chaetodon selene 
Chaetodon melannotus 
Chaetodon ocellicaudus
Chaetodon rafflesi 
Chaetodon auriga 
Chaetodon vagabundus
Chaetodon collare
Chaetodon adiergastos
Chaetodon fasciatus 
Chaetodon lunula
Chaetodon semilarvatus 
Chaetodon lineolatus
Chaetodon oxycephalus 
Chaetodon falcula 
Chaetodon ulietensis

Fossil record

The oldest fossils that are usually assigned to Chaetodon date from the late Oligocene, about 25 million years ago. But since it is not easy to distinguish this genus from close relatives, it may be that the Oligocene fossils are actually of other Chaetodontidae. The fossil record of this family is scant indeed, only Chelmon (or some similar genus like Chelmonops or Coradion) being known from Miocene remains. As even crude molecular clocks suggest that the ancestors of the Chaetodon and the Chelmops lineage diverged in the Late Eocene already, nothing more can be said without new fossils being discovered.

Footnotes

References

 Blum, S. D. (1988): Osteology and Phylogeny of the Chaetodontidae (Pisces: Perciformes). University of Hawaii, Honolulu.
 Fessler, Jennifer L. & Westneat, Mark W. (2007): Molecular phylogenetics of the butterflyfishes (Chaetodontidae): Taxonomy and biogeography of a global coral reef fish family. Molecular Phylogenetics and Evolution 45(1): 50–68. 
 Hsu, Kui-Ching; Chen, Jeng-Ping & Shao, Kwang-Tsao (2007): Molecular phylogeny of Chaetodon (Teleostei: Chaetodontidae) in the Indo-West Pacific: evolution in geminate species pairs and species groups. Raffles Bulletin of Zoology Supplement 14: 77-86. PDF fulltext
 Sepkoski, Jack (2002): [Chaetodon]. In: A compendium of fossil marine animal genera. Bulletins of American Paleontology 364: 560. HTML database excerpt

External links
 
 

 
Extant Chattian first appearances
Taxa named by Carl Linnaeus
Marine fish genera
Chattian genus first appearances